Pointe d'Anterne is a mountain of Haute-Savoie, France. It lies in the Chablais Alps. It has an altitude of  2733 metres above sea level.

Mountains of the Alps
Mountains of Haute-Savoie